William Balée (born 1954) is a professor of anthropology at Tulane University in New Orleans, Louisiana. 

He was born in Fort Lauderdale, Florida and educated at the University of Florida, Gainesville, where he received a B.A. in Anthropology before moving on to Columbia University in New York City where he earned a Ph.D. in Anthropology (1984).

Balée was appointed research fellow in 1984 by the New York Botanical Garden, collecting plants for an ethnobotany project sponsored by a Noble Grant.  Later he took up a research position with the Museu Goeldi in Belém, Brazil.

His primary ethnographic work was with the Ka'apor indigenous culture of Maranhão, Brazil (Balée 1994). During his time in Brazil, however, he also carried out fieldwork with the Tembé, the Assurini of the Xingu River, the Araweté of the Ipishuna, which is also a tributary of the Xingu, and the Guajá.

However, he is most renowned as a proponent and foremost expert of historical ecology (Balée 1998). Balée has proposed four interdependent postulates, which set historical ecology apart from other more traditional research programs. Basically summarized, these postulates are: (1) Humans have affected nearly all environments on Earth; (2) Humans do not have an innate propensity to decrease biotic and landscape diversity or to increase it; (3) Various types of societies impact their landscapes in dissimilar ways; (4) Human interactions with landscapes can be comprehended holistically.

Historical ecologists study the interaction between the human and natural worlds and the subsequent human responses to environmental influences. Humans often respond to these environmental stimuli by altering their landscapes, but maintaining their culture and practices. Due to the constant human adaptation of the environment, it is increasingly difficult, if not impossible, to behold an environment anywhere on the planet that is untouched. These human-created modifications are known as human-mediated disturbances, and are studied to learn of humans’ role in the history of the land. The second and third postulates emphasize the fact that humanity is not homogeneous, and therefore, our impacts will not be either.  Humans have been known to both increase and decrease the biodiversity of landscapes throughout time.  Broadcast fires, for example, can often create niches for new species in the landscape, while simple deforestation can drastically decrease the biodiversity.  Human impacts on the landscape are as varied as the languages, political systems, and societies present in the world. Finally, people and the landscape can be studied holistically because the landscape incorporates both people and the environment. The landscape is visual evidence of the interaction of culture and the environment.

Currently he is working on issues of applied historical ecology.

Dr. Balée has won the Mary W. Klinger Book Award from the Society for Economic Botany for two of his books, in 1996 (Footprints of the Forest) and 2014 (Cultural Forests of the Amazon). He was appointed Officer of the Order of the Golden Ark, a Dutch conservation merit order, by Prince Bernhard in 1993. In 2016 he received the President’s Award for Excellence in Graduate and Professional Teaching from Tulane University.  He is a 2019 Guggenheim Fellow. Balée is the 2023 recipient of the Distinguished Ethnobiologist Award from the Society of Ethnobiology.

See also 
 Carl O. Sauer (geographer)

References

Sources 
Balée, William. 2013. Cultural Forests of the Amazon: A Historical Ecology of People and their Landscapes. Tuscaloosa: University of Alabama Press.
Balée, William 2012 Inside Cultures: A New Introduction to Cultural Anthropology. Walnut Creek, CA: Left Coast Press.
Balee William. 2016. Inside Cultures. Second Edition. New York and London: Routledge.
Balée, William (editor) 1998 Advances in Historical Ecology.  Historical Ecology Series, New York: Columbia University Press.
Balée, William	1994 Footprints of the Forest: Ka’apor Ethnobotany—the Historical Ecology of Plant Utilization by an Amazonian People. New York: Columbia University Press.
Balée, William (editor) 1989 Nomenclatural patterns in Ka'apor ethnobotany (Journal of Ethnobiology).

American anthropologists
Tulane University faculty
Ethnobiologists
Living people
1954 births
Environmental studies scholars